Vértesboglár is a village in Fejér county, Hungary.

External links 

 Street map 
 
 

Populated places in Fejér County
Hungarian German communities